The SRS Distribution 250 is a NASCAR Xfinity Series race that has taken place each spring at Texas Motor Speedway since 1997. Since 2005, this has been one of two races for the series at the track, the other being the Andy's Frozen Custard 300 in the fall.

In 2011, the race became a Friday night race after being held on Saturday afternoon since 1997. In 2017, the race returned to being on a Saturday afternoon and My Bariatric Solutions, a part of Wise Health System, became the title sponsor of the race. In 2021, the race was moved from April to June and paired with the track's spring Truck Series race, which had previously been held in June, and the NASCAR All-Star Race, which moved from Bristol Motor Speedway to Texas that year. Also, the distance of the race was reduced from 300 to 250 miles and Alsco became the title sponsor of the race that year. In 2022, the All-Star Race and the Xfinity and Truck races on the same weekend were moved from June to May. SRS Distribution was the title sponsor of the race that year.

Tyler Reddick is the defending winner of the race after having won it in 2022.

Past winners

1999 and 2002: Races shortened due to rain.
2006, 2020 and 2021: Races extended due to NASCAR overtime.
2010: Race postponed from Saturday to Monday due to rain.
2020: Race postponed from March 28 due to the COVID-19 pandemic. Austin Cindric declared winner after Kyle Busch was disqualified for failing inspection.

Multiple winners (drivers)

Multiple winners (teams)

Manufacturer wins

References

External links
 

1997 establishments in Texas
NASCAR Xfinity Series races
 
Recurring sporting events established in 1997
Annual sporting events in the United States